The 1971–72 season was the 92nd season of competitive football by Rangers.

Overview
Rangers played a total of 56 competitive matches during the 1971–72 season. They won their first and only European trophy this season. The side won the European Cup Winners' Cup in Barcelona, Spain. The match was effectively over by half time thanks to goals from Colin Stein and a double from Willie Johnston. The Soviet team Dynamo Moscow did score twice in the second half but Rangers held on for a famous victory.

Domestically, Waddell's side finished a disappointing third in the Scottish League Division One. The club ended the season without the Scottish Cup or League Cup's after being knocked out of the former by Hibernian at the semi-final stage. They never progressed from the sectional rounds in the League Cup.

Results
All results are written with Rangers' score first.

Scottish First Division

Cup Winners' Cup

Scottish Cup

League Cup

*Rangers failed to reach the Quarter-finals

Appearances

See also
 1971–72 in Scottish football
 1971–72 Scottish Cup
 1971–72 Scottish League Cup
 1971–72 European Cup Winners' Cup

References 

Rangers F.C. seasons
Rangers
UEFA Cup Winners' Cup-winning seasons